Mirna Deak (born 2 March 1974 in Brežice, SFR Yugoslavia) is a former Croatian female basketball player.

References

External links
Profile at fiba.com
Profile at eurobasket.com

1974 births
Living people
People from Brežice
Croatian women's basketball players
Centers (basketball)
Croatian expatriate basketball people in Slovenia
Croatian expatriate basketball people in Bosnia and Herzegovina